Hypoalphalipoproteinemia is a high-density lipoprotein deficiency, inherited in an autosomal dominant manner.

It can be associated with LDL receptor.

Associated regions and genes include:

niacin is sometimes prescribed to raise HDL levels.

References

External links 

Autosomal dominant disorders
Lipid metabolism disorders